John Forbes Nash, Jr. (June 13, 1928 – May 23, 2015) was an American mathematician who made fundamental contributions to game theory, real algebraic geometry, differential geometry, and partial differential equations. Nash and fellow game theorists John Harsanyi and Reinhard Selten were awarded the 1994 Nobel Memorial Prize in Economics. In 2015, he and Louis Nirenberg were awarded the Abel Prize for their contributions to the field of partial differential equations.

As a graduate student in the Mathematics Department at Princeton University, Nash introduced a number of concepts (including Nash equilibrium and the Nash bargaining solution) which are now considered  central to game theory and its applications in various sciences. In the 1950s, Nash discovered and proved the Nash embedding theorems by solving a system of nonlinear partial differential equations arising in Riemannian geometry. This work, also introducing a preliminary form of the Nash–Moser theorem, was later recognized by the American Mathematical Society with the Leroy P. Steele Prize for Seminal Contribution to Research. Ennio De Giorgi and Nash found, with separate methods, a body of results paving the way for a systematic understanding of elliptic and parabolic partial differential equations. Their De Giorgi–Nash theorem on the smoothness of solutions of such equations resolved Hilbert's nineteenth problem on regularity in the calculus of variations, which had been a well-known open problem for almost sixty years.

In 1959, Nash began showing clear signs of mental illness, and spent several years at psychiatric hospitals being treated for schizophrenia. After 1970, his condition slowly improved, allowing him to return to academic work by the mid-1980s. His struggles with his illness and his recovery became the basis for Sylvia Nasar's biographical book A Beautiful Mind in 1998, as well as a film of the same name directed by Ron Howard, in which Nash was portrayed by Russell Crowe.

Early life and education 
John Forbes Nash Jr. was born on June 13, 1928, in Bluefield, West Virginia. His father and namesake, John Forbes Nash Sr., was an electrical engineer for the Appalachian Electric Power Company. His mother, Margaret Virginia (née Martin) Nash, had been a schoolteacher before she was married. He was baptized in the Episcopal Church. He had a younger sister, Martha (born November 16, 1930).

Nash attended kindergarten and public school, and he learned from books provided by his parents and grandparents. Nash's parents pursued opportunities to supplement their son's education, and arranged for him to take advanced mathematics courses at a local community college during his final year of high school. He attended Carnegie Institute of Technology (which later became Carnegie Mellon University) through a full benefit of the George Westinghouse Scholarship, initially majoring in chemical engineering. He switched to a chemistry major and eventually, at the advice of his teacher John Lighton Synge, to mathematics.  After graduating in 1948, with both a B.S. and M.S. in mathematics, Nash accepted a fellowship to Princeton University, where he pursued further graduate studies in mathematics and sciences.

Nash's adviser and former Carnegie professor Richard Duffin wrote a letter of recommendation for Nash's entrance to Princeton stating, "He is a mathematical genius". Nash was also accepted at Harvard University. However, the chairman of the mathematics department at Princeton, Solomon Lefschetz, offered him the John S. Kennedy fellowship, convincing Nash that Princeton valued him more. Further, he considered Princeton more favorably because of its proximity to his family in Bluefield. At Princeton, he began work on his equilibrium theory, later known as the Nash equilibrium.

Research contributions 

Nash did not publish extensively, although many of his papers are considered landmarks in their fields. As a graduate student at Princeton, he made foundational contributions to game theory and real algebraic geometry. As a postdoctoral fellow at MIT, Nash turned to differential geometry. Although the results of Nash's work on differential geometry are phrased in a geometrical language, the work is almost entirely to do with the mathematical analysis of partial differential equations. After proving his two isometric embedding theorems, Nash turned to research dealing directly with partial differential equations, where he discovered and proved the De Giorgi–Nash theorem, thereby resolving one form of Hilbert's nineteenth problem.

In 2011, the National Security Agency declassified letters written by Nash in the 1950s, in which he had proposed a new encryption–decryption machine. The letters show that Nash had anticipated many concepts of modern cryptography, which are based on computational hardness.

Game theory 
Nash earned a PhD in 1950 with a 28-page dissertation on non-cooperative games. The thesis, written under the supervision of doctoral advisor Albert W. Tucker, contained the definition and properties of the Nash equilibrium, a crucial concept in non-cooperative games. A version of his thesis was published a year later in the Annals of Mathematics. In the early 1950s, Nash carried out research on a number of related concepts in game theory, including the theory of cooperative games. For his work, Nash was one of the recipients of the Nobel Memorial Prize in Economic Sciences in 1994.

Real algebraic geometry 
In 1949, while still a graduate student, Nash found a new result in the mathematical field of real algebraic geometry. He announced his theorem in a contributed paper at the International Congress of Mathematicians in 1950, although he had not yet worked out the details of its proof. Nash's theorem was finalized by October 1951, when Nash submitted his work to the Annals of Mathematics. It had been well-known since the 1930s that every closed smooth manifold is diffeomorphic to the zero set of some collection of smooth functions on Euclidean space. In his work, Nash proved that those smooth functions can be taken to be polynomials. This was widely regarded as a surprising result, since the class of smooth functions and smooth manifolds is usually far more flexible than the class of polynomials. Nash's proof introduced the concepts now known as Nash function and Nash manifold, which have since been widely studied in real algebraic geometry. Nash's theorem itself was famously applied by Michael Artin and Barry Mazur to the study of dynamical systems, by combining Nash's polynomial approximation together with Bézout's theorem.

Differential geometry
During his postdoctoral position at MIT, Nash was eager to find high-profile mathematical problems to study. From Warren Ambrose, a differential geometer, he learned about the conjecture that any Riemannian manifold is isometric to a submanifold of Euclidean space. Nash's results proving the conjecture are now known as the Nash embedding theorems, the second of which Mikhael Gromov has called "one of the main achievements of mathematics of the twentieth century".

Nash's first embedding theorem was found in 1953. He found that any Riemannian manifold can be isometrically embedded in a Euclidean space by a continuously differentiable mapping. Nash's construction allows the codimension of the embedding to be very small, with the effect that in many cases it is logically impossible that a highly-differentiable isometric embedding exists. (Based on Nash's techniques, Nicolaas Kuiper soon found even smaller codimensions, with the improved result often known as the Nash–Kuiper theorem.) As such, Nash's embeddings are limited to the setting of low differentiability. For this reason, Nash's result is somewhat outside the mainstream in the field of differential geometry, where high differentiability is significant in much of the usual analysis.

However, the logic of Nash's work has been found to be useful in many other contexts in mathematical analysis. Starting with work of Camillo De Lellis and László Székelyhidi, the ideas of Nash's proof were applied for various constructions of turbulent solutions of the Euler equations in fluid mechanics. In the 1970s, Mikhael Gromov developed Nash's ideas into the general framework of convex integration, which has been (among other uses) applied by Stefan Müller and Vladimír Šverák to construct counterexamples to generalized forms of Hilbert's nineteenth problem in the calculus of variations.

Nash found the construction of smoothly differentiable isometric embeddings to be unexpectedly difficult. However, after around a year and a half of intensive work, his efforts succeeded, thereby proving the second Nash embedding theorem. The ideas involved in proving this second theorem are largely separate from those used in proving the first. The fundamental aspect of the proof is an implicit function theorem for isometric embeddings. The usual formulations of the implicit function theorem are inapplicable, for technical reasons related to the loss of regularity phenomena. Nash's resolution of this issue, given by deforming an isometric embedding by an ordinary differential equation along which extra regularity is continually injected, is regarded as a fundamentally novel technique in mathematical analysis. Nash's paper was awarded the Leroy P. Steele Prize for Seminal Contribution to Research in 1999, where his "most original idea" in the resolution of the loss of regularity issue was cited as "one of the great achievements in mathematical analysis in this century". According to Gromov:

Due to Jürgen Moser's extension of Nash's ideas for application to other problems (notably in celestial mechanics), the resulting implicit function theorem is known as the Nash–Moser theorem. It has been extended and generalized by a number of other authors, among them Gromov, Richard Hamilton, Lars Hörmander, Jacob Schwartz, and Eduard Zehnder. Nash himself analyzed the problem in the context of analytic functions. Schwartz later commented that Nash's ideas were "not just novel, but very mysterious," and that it was very hard to "get to the bottom of it." According to Gromov:

Partial differential equations
While spending time at the Courant Institute in New York City, Louis Nirenberg informed Nash of a well-known conjecture in the field of elliptic partial differential equations. In 1938, Charles Morrey had proved a fundamental elliptic regularity result for functions of two independent variables, but analogous results for functions of more than two variables had proved elusive. After extensive discussions with Nirenberg and Lars Hörmander, Nash was able to extend Morrey's results, not only to functions of more than two variables, but also to the context of parabolic partial differential equations. In his work, as in Morrey's, uniform control over the continuity of the solutions to such equations is achieved, without assuming any level of differentiability on the coefficients of the equation. The Nash inequality was a particular result found in the course of his work (the proof of which Nash attributed to Elias Stein), which has been found useful in other contexts.

Soon after, Nash learned from Paul Garabedian, recently returned from Italy, that the then-unknown Ennio De Giorgi had found nearly identical results for elliptic partial differential equations. De Giorgi and Nash's methods had little to do with one another, although Nash's were somewhat more powerful in applying to both elliptic and parabolic equations. A few years later, inspired by De Giorgi's method, Jürgen Moser found a different approach to the same results, and the resulting body of work is now known as the De Giorgi–Nash theorem or the De Giorgi–Nash–Moser theory (which is distinct from the Nash–Moser theorem). De Giorgi and Moser's methods became particularly influential over the next several years, through their developments in the works of Olga Ladyzhenskaya, James Serrin, and Neil Trudinger, among others. Their work, based primarily on the judicious choice of test functions in the weak formulation of partial differential equations, is in strong contrast to Nash's work, which is based on analysis of the heat kernel. Nash's approach to the De Giorgi–Nash theory was later revisited by Eugene Fabes and Daniel Stroock, initiating the re-derivation and extension of the results originally obtained from De Giorgi and Moser's techniques.

From the fact that minimizers to many functionals in the calculus of variations solve elliptic partial differential equations, Hilbert's nineteenth problem (on the smoothness of these minimizers), conjectured almost sixty years prior, was directly amenable to the De Giorgi–Nash theory. Nash received instant recognition for his work, with Peter Lax describing it as a "stroke of genius". Nash would later speculate that had it not been for De Giorgi's simultaneous discovery, he would have been a recipient of the prestigious Fields Medal in 1958. Although the medal committee's reasoning is not fully known, and was not purely based on questions of mathematical merit, archival research has shown that Nash placed third in the committee's vote for the medal, after the two mathematicians (Klaus Roth and René Thom) who were awarded the medal that year.

Mental illness 
Although Nash's mental illness first began to manifest in the form of paranoia, his wife later described his behavior as erratic. Nash thought that all men who wore red ties were part of a communist conspiracy against him. He mailed letters to embassies in Washington, D.C., declaring that they were establishing a government. Nash's psychological issues crossed into his professional life when he gave an American Mathematical Society lecture at Columbia University in early 1959. Originally intended to present proof of the Riemann hypothesis, the lecture was incomprehensible. Colleagues in the audience immediately realized that something was wrong.

In April 1959, Nash was admitted to McLean Hospital for one month. Based on his paranoid, persecutory delusions, hallucinations, and increasing asociality, he was diagnosed with schizophrenia. In 1961, Nash was admitted to the New Jersey State Hospital at Trenton. Over the next nine years, he spent intervals of time in psychiatric hospitals, where he received both antipsychotic medications and insulin shock therapy.

Although he sometimes took prescribed medication, Nash later wrote that he did so only under pressure. According to Nash, the film A Beautiful Mind inaccurately implied he was taking atypical antipsychotics. He attributed the depiction to the screenwriter who was worried about the film encouraging people with mental illness to stop taking their medication.

Nash did not take any medication after 1970, nor was he committed to a hospital ever again. Nash recovered gradually.  Encouraged by his then former wife, de Lardé, Nash lived at home and spent his time in the Princeton mathematics department where his eccentricities were accepted even when his mental condition was poor. De Lardé credits his recovery to maintaining "a quiet life" with social support.

Nash dated the start of what he termed "mental disturbances" to the early months of 1959, when his wife was pregnant. He described a process of change "from scientific rationality of thinking into the delusional thinking characteristic of persons who are psychiatrically diagnosed as 'schizophrenic' or 'paranoid schizophrenic. For Nash, this included seeing himself as a messenger or having a special function of some kind, of having supporters and opponents and hidden schemers, along with a feeling of being persecuted and searching for signs representing divine revelation. Nash suggested his delusional thinking was related to his unhappiness, his desire to be recognized, and his characteristic way of thinking, saying, "I wouldn't have had good scientific ideas if I had thought more normally." He also said, "If I felt completely pressureless I don't think I would have gone in this pattern".

Nash reported that he started hearing voices in 1964, then later engaged in a process of consciously rejecting them.  He only renounced his "dream-like delusional hypotheses" after a prolonged period of involuntary commitment in mental hospitals—"enforced rationality". Upon doing so, he was temporarily able to return to productive work as a mathematician. By the late 1960s, he relapsed.  Eventually, he "intellectually rejected" his " influenced" and "politically oriented" thinking as a waste of effort.  In 1995, he said that he didn't realize his full potential due to nearly 30 years of mental illness.

Nash wrote in 1994:

Recognition and later career 

In 1978, Nash was awarded the John von Neumann Theory Prize for his discovery of non-cooperative equilibria, now called Nash Equilibria. He won the Leroy P. Steele Prize in 1999.

In 1994, he received the Nobel Memorial Prize in Economic Sciences (along with John Harsanyi and Reinhard Selten) for his game theory work as a Princeton graduate student. In the late 1980s, Nash had begun to use email to gradually link with working mathematicians who realized that he was  John Nash and that his new work had value. They formed part of the nucleus of a group that contacted the Bank of Sweden's Nobel award committee and were able to vouch for Nash's mental health and ability to receive the award.

Nash's later work involved ventures in advanced game theory, including partial agency, which show that, as in his early career, he preferred to select his own path and problems. Between 1945 and 1996, he published 23 scientific studies.

Nash has suggested hypotheses on mental illness. He has compared not thinking in an acceptable manner, or being "insane" and not fitting into a usual social function, to being "on strike" from an economic point of view. He advanced views in evolutionary psychology about the potential benefits of apparently nonstandard behaviors or roles.

Nash developed work on the role of money in society.  He criticized interest groups that promote quasi-doctrines based on Keynesian economics that permit manipulative short-term inflation and debt tactics that ultimately undermine currencies. He suggested a global "industrial consumption price index" system that would support the development of more "ideal money" that people could trust rather than more unstable "bad money." He noted that some of his thinking parallels that of economist and political philosopher Friedrich Hayek, regarding money and an atypical viewpoint of the function of authority.

Nash received an honorary degree, Doctor of Science and Technology, from Carnegie Mellon University in 1999, an honorary degree in economics from the University of Naples Federico II in 2003, an honorary doctorate in economics from the University of Antwerp in 2007, an honorary doctorate of science from the City University of Hong Kong in 2011, and was keynote speaker at a conference on game theory. Nash also received honorary doctorates from two West Virginia colleges: the University of Charleston in 2003 and West Virginia University Tech in 2006. He was a prolific guest speaker at a number of events, such as the Warwick Economics Summit in 2005, at the University of Warwick.

Nash was elected to the American Philosophical Society in 2006 and became a fellow of the American Mathematical Society in 2012.

On May 19, 2015, a few days before his death, Nash, along with Louis Nirenberg, was awarded the 2015 Abel Prize by King Harald V of Norway at a ceremony in Oslo.

Personal life 
In 1951, the Massachusetts Institute of Technology (MIT) hired Nash as a C. L. E. Moore instructor in the mathematics faculty. About a year later, Nash began a relationship with Eleanor Stier, a nurse he met while admitted as a patient. They had a son, John David Stier, but Nash left Stier when she told him of her pregnancy. The film based on Nash's life, A Beautiful Mind, was criticized during the run-up to the 2002 Oscars for omitting this aspect of his life. He was said to have abandoned her based on her social status, which he thought to have been beneath his.

In Santa Monica, California, in 1954, while in his twenties, Nash was arrested for indecent exposure in a sting operation targeting gay men. Although the charges were dropped, he was stripped of his top-secret security clearance and fired from RAND Corporation, where he had worked as a consultant.

Not long after breaking up with Stier, Nash met Alicia Lardé Lopez-Harrison, a naturalized U.S. citizen from El Salvador. Lardé graduated from MIT, having majored in physics. They married in February 1957. Although Nash was an atheist, the ceremony was performed in an Episcopal church. In 1958, Nash was appointed to a tenured position at MIT, and his first signs of mental illness soon became evident. He resigned his position at MIT in the spring of 1959. His son, John Charles Martin Nash, was born a few months later. The child was not named for a year because Alicia felt that Nash should have a say in choosing the name. Due to the stress of dealing with his illness, Nash and Lardé divorced in 1963. After his final hospital discharge in 1970, Nash lived in Lardé's house as a boarder. This stability seemed to help him, and he learned how to consciously discard his paranoid delusions. Princeton allowed him to audit classes. He continued to work on mathematics and was eventually allowed to teach again. In the 1990s, Lardé and Nash resumed their relationship, remarrying in 2001. John Charles Martin Nash earned a PhD in mathematics from Rutgers University and was diagnosed with schizophrenia as an adult.

Death 
On May 23, 2015, Nash and his wife died in a car accident on the New Jersey Turnpike near Exit 8A in Monroe Township, NJ. After a visit to Norway, where Nash had received the Abel Prize, they had made arrangements to be picked up by a limo at Newark Airport. But because of a change in flight plans at the last minute they arrived five hours earlier, and decided to take a taxi instead. Their taxicab driver, Tarek Girgis, lost control of the vehicle and struck a guardrail. Both passengers were ejected from the car upon impact. State police revealed that it appeared neither passenger was wearing a seatbelt at the time of the crash. At the time of his death, the 86-year-old Nash was a longtime resident of New Jersey. He was survived by two sons, John Charles Martin Nash, who lived with his parents at the time of their death, and elder child John Stier.

Following his death, obituaries appeared in scientific and popular media throughout the world. In addition to their obituary for Nash, The New York Times published an article containing quotes from Nash that had been assembled from media and other published sources. The quotes consisted of Nash's reflections on his life and achievements.

Legacy 
At Princeton in the 1970s, Nash became known as "The Phantom of Fine Hall" (Princeton's mathematics center), a shadowy figure who would scribble arcane equations on blackboards in the middle of the night.

He is referred to in a novel set at Princeton, The Mind-Body Problem, 1983, by Rebecca Goldstein.

Sylvia Nasar's biography of Nash, A Beautiful Mind, was published in 1998. A film by the same name was released in 2001, directed by Ron Howard with Russell Crowe playing Nash; it won four Academy Awards, including Best Picture. For his performance as Nash, Crowe won the Golden Globe Award for Best Actor – Motion Picture Drama at the 59th Golden Globe Awards and the BAFTA Award for Best Actor at the 55th British Academy Film Awards. Crowe was also nominated for the Academy Award for Best Actor for his performance as Nash at the 74th Academy Awards.

Awards 
 1978 – INFORMS John von Neumann Theory Prize (with Carlton Lemke) "for their outstanding contributions to the theory of games"
 1994 – Sveriges Riksbank Prize in Economic Sciences in Memory of Alfred Nobel (with John Harsanyi and Reinhard Selten) "for their pioneering analysis of equilibria in the theory of non-cooperative games"
 1999 – Leroy P. Steele Prize for Seminal Contribution to Research for his 1956 paper "The imbedding problem for Riemannian manifolds"
 2002 class of Fellows of the Institute for Operations Research and the Management Sciences
 2010 – Double Helix Medal
 2015 – Abel Prize (with Louis Nirenberg) "for striking and seminal contributions to the theory of nonlinear partial differential equations and its applications to geometric analysis"

Documentaries and interviews 
 
 
 
 

Publication list 

 

 
 
 
 
 
 
 
 
 
 
 
 
 
 
 
 
 
 

Four of Nash's game-theoretic papers  and three of his pure mathematics papers  were collected in the following:

References

Bibliography

External links 

 Home Page of John F. Nash Jr. at Princeton
 
 IDEAS/RePEc
 "Nash Equilibrium" 2002 Slate article by Robert Wright, about Nash's work and world government
 NSA releases Nash Encryption Machine plans to National Cryptologic Museum for public viewing, 2012
 
 Nash, John (1928–2015) | Rare Books and Special Collections from Princeton's Mudd Library, including a copy of his dissertation (PDF)
 Biography of John Forbes Nash Jr. from the Institute for Operations Research and the Management Sciences
 

1928 births
2015 deaths
20th-century American mathematicians
Abel Prize laureates
American atheists
American Nobel laureates
Board game designers
Carnegie Mellon University alumni
Institute for Advanced Study visiting scholars
Differential geometers
Fellows of the American Mathematical Society
Fellows of the Econometric Society
Fellows of the Institute for Operations Research and the Management Sciences
Game theorists
John von Neumann Theory Prize winners
Massachusetts Institute of Technology School of Science faculty
Members of the United States National Academy of Sciences
Nobel laureates in Economics
PDE theorists
People from Bluefield, West Virginia
People from West Windsor, New Jersey
People with schizophrenia
Road incident deaths in New Jersey
Princeton University alumni
Princeton University faculty
Mathematicians from West Virginia
Mathematicians from New Jersey
McLean Hospital patients
Members of the American Philosophical Society
Scientists with disabilities